Santo Stefano Roero is a comune (municipality) in the Province of Cuneo in the Italian region Piedmont, located about  southeast of Turin and about  northeast of Cuneo.

Santo Stefano Roero borders the following municipalities: Canale, Montà, Monteu Roero, and Pralormo.

Demographic evolution

References

Cities and towns in Piedmont
Roero